Hornungia alpina (also Hutchinsia alpina or Pritzelago alpina) is a flowering plant in the family Brassicaceae. It is native to the mountains of Southern and Central Europe, as far south as northern Spain (Pyrenees and Cordillera Cantábrica), central Italy and North Macedonia , and is sometimes grown as an ornamental plant in gardens .

References

External links

Brassicaceae
Alpine flora
Flora of Europe
Flora of the Pyrenees
Flora of the Alps
Garden plants of Europe